Jagannath, Nepal may refer to:

Jagannath, Bheri
 Jagannath, Seti